Spring Creek is an unincorporated community in Madison County, Tennessee, United States. The zipcode is 38378.

History
Spring Creek was named for a nearby stream of the same name, a tributary of the Middle Fork of the Forked Deer River, after a post office opened there in the spring of 1824. A municipal charter was granted in January 1854, and the West Tennessee Baptist Male Institute was chartered in Spring Creek that March. The Institute, later called Madison College, continued operation until it burned down in February 1876.

The community remained mostly untouched during the American Civil War, save for commercial disruptions. Its main commerce at the time consisted of cotton and wheat production.

Spring Creek's high school, built in the early 20th century, disbanded in 1943 to consolidate with others in the formation of North Side High School, and its elementary school closed in 1964.

References

Citations

Bibliography
 

Unincorporated communities in Madison County, Tennessee
Unincorporated communities in Tennessee